Sir Edward Lancelot Mallalieu (14 March 1905 – 11 November 1979), known as Lance Mallalieu, was a British politician.

Of Huguenot origin, a son of Frederick Mallalieu, a Member of Parliament, Mallalieu's ancestors had settled at Saddleworth in the early 1600s, where they lived in humble circumstances working as weavers. Frederick Mallalieu's father, Henry (1831–1902), was a self-made businessman, at the age of twelve a hand-loom weaver, but becoming a woolen manufacturer, chairman of ironworks companies, and the magistrate.

Lancelot Mallalieu was educated at the Dragon School, Oxford., Cheltenham College and Trinity College, Oxford.

At the 1931 general election, Mallalieu was elected as the Liberal Party Member of Parliament (MP) for Colne Valley. His win was notable as it was a gain from Labour despite the presence of a Conservative candidate, unusual for 1931. His predecessor was the Labour Chancellor of the Exchequer Philip Snowden, who had decided to stand down. His father Frederick Mallalieu had been MP for the same seat from 1916 to 1922.

Mallalieu was a member of the main Liberal group in parliament led by Sir Herbert Samuel. He followed his leader into opposition in 1933. He served until the 1935 general election, when he lost his seat to Labour's Ernest Marklew.

After joining the Labour Party, he returned to the House of Commons in 1948, at a by-election on 24 March in the Brigg constituency, where he served as MP until he retired in 1974. He was a Deputy Speaker of the Commons from 1971 to 1974.

Mallalieu was knighted in the 1979 Dissolution Honours.

Family
Edward Mallalieu's brother, William, was Labour MP for Huddersfield from 1945 to 1950, then for Huddersfield East from 1950 to 1979. Sir William Mallalieu's daughter, Ann, has been a Labour life peer since 1991. His uncle, Albert Henry Mallalieu, was head of that family of Tan-y-Marian, Llandudno.

Arms

References

External links
 

Colne Valley Liberal Democrats: political history, Edward Mallalieu

1905 births
1979 deaths
People educated at The Dragon School
Alumni of Trinity College, Oxford
Labour Party (UK) MPs for English constituencies
Liberal Party (UK) MPs for English constituencies
UK MPs 1931–1935
UK MPs 1945–1950
UK MPs 1950–1951
UK MPs 1951–1955
UK MPs 1955–1959
UK MPs 1959–1964
UK MPs 1964–1966
UK MPs 1966–1970
UK MPs 1970–1974
Knights Bachelor
Church Estates Commissioners